Pathampuzha is a small village in the Kottayam district of Kerala state, India.Aruvikkachal waterfall (only during monsoon season) is one of the tourist attraction here.

References

External links 

Villages in Kottayam district
Waterfalls of Kerala